Pulse Radio or Pulse radio may refer to:

 Pulse! Radio, a student run radio station at the London School of Economics in London, England
 Pulse 1 Radio, an independent FM radio station in West Yorkshire, England
 Pulse 2 Radio, an independent AM radio station in West Yorkshire, England